Allium tenuicaule is an Asian species of wild onion found in Pakistan, Afghanistan, Iran, Uzbekistan and Tajikistan. It has a cluster of narrow bulbs, and a scape up to 20 cm tall. Leaves are very narrow and hair-like. Flowers are dark purple.

References

tenuicaule
Onions
Flora of Pakistan
Flora of temperate Asia
Plants described in 1887